Ranjeet Bedi (born 13 September 1942 as Gopal Bedi) popularly known as Ranjeet, is an Indian actor and film director born in Jandiala Guru near Amritsar (Punjab), best known for his work in Bollywood.  He has mostly played villain roles in over 200 Hindi films. Ranjeet has also played a positive character in the TV series Aisa Des Hai Mera. He has also worked in a number of Punjabi films namely Rab Ne Banayian Jodiyan and Man Jeete Jag Jeet.

Biography
Ranjeet's real name is Gopal Bedi. Besides acting in over 200 Hindi movies, he has also done a television serial Aisa Des Hai Mera and a couple of Punjabi films.
He shot to fame after playing a negative role in the film Sharmeelee. Sunil Dutt had recommended his name after liking his performance in Sawan Bhadon and Reshma Aur Shera. Ranjeet had come to Mumbai to play the lead role in Zindagi Ki Rahen, which was shelved. He went ahead to establish himself as a leading villain in the seventies and early eighties. 
In personal life, he is a vegetarian and non-smoker.

Filmography

Films

 Sawan Bhadon (1970)
 Sharmeelee (1971) as Kundan
 Reshma Aur Shera (1971) as Gopal
 Hulchul (1971)
 Haseenon Ka Devata (1971)
 Dost Aur Dushman (1971)
 Parchhaiyan (1972)
 Bhai Ho To Aisa (1972) as Dacoit Mangal Singh
 Raampur Ka Lakshman (1972) (as Ranjit) as Peter
 Victoria No. 203 (1972)
 Gaddar (1973)
 Man Jeete Jag Jeet (1973)
 Keemat (1973) as Pedro
 Kashmakash (1973)
 Dhamkee (1973)
 Bandhe Haath (1973) as Ranjeet
 Jheel Ke Us Paar (1973) as Balraj
 Sacha Mera Roop Hai (1974)
 Pran Jaye Par Vachan Na Jaye (1974) as Bandit
 Mr. Romeo (1974) as Raja Dada
 Khote Sikkay (1974) as Salim
 Farebi (1974)
 Duniya Ka Mela (1974)
 36 Ghante (1974) as Ajit
 Aap Ki Kasam (1974) as Suresh
 Imtihan (1974) as Rakesh
 Amir Garib (1974) as Ranjit
 Haath Ki Safai (1974) as Ranjeet
 Uljhan (1975) as Brij
 Sewak (1975)
 Raftaar (1975) as Chandu Banjara
 Ponga Pandit (1975) as Master
 Neelima (1975)
 Himalay Se Ooncha (1975) as Ranjeet
 Dhoti Lota Aur Chowpatty (1975) as Ranjeet
 Aakhri Dao (1975) as Dilawar Singh
 Dharmatma (1975) as Rishi
 Maa (1976) as Balraj
 Laila Majnu (1976) as Tabrej
 Koi Jeeta Koi Haara (1976)
 Gumrah (1976) as Ranjeet
 Deewangee (1976)
 Bandalbaaz (1976) as Ranjeet Gupta
 Aaj Ka Mahaatma (1976) as Tony
 Nagin (1976)
 Bhanwar (1976) as Ravi
 Zamaanat (1977)
 Kachcha Chor (1977)
 Dharam Veer (1977) as Ranjeet Singh
 Chor Sipahee (1977) as Sheikh Jamal
 Chhailla Babu (1977)
 Chandi Sona (1977) as Sheroo
 Chalta Purza (1977) as Ranjeet
 Amar Akbar Anthony (1977) as Ranjeet (Guest Appearance)
 Ab Kya Hoga (1977) (uncredited) as Dr. Prem Mishra
 Khoon Pasina (1977) as Raghu
 Phool Khile Hain Gulshan Gulshan (1978) as Bhiku Prasad
 Phaansi (1978) as Tilak Singh
 Parmatma (1978) as Johnny
 Naya Daur (1978)
 Kaala Aadmi (1978)
 Heeralaal Pannalaal (1978) as Jaggu
 Daku Aur Jawan (1978)
 Anjane Mein (1978)
 Amar Shakti (1978) as Sardar's son
 Vishwanath (1978) as Kokha
 Aakhri Daku (1978)
 Phandebaaz (1978)
 Muqaddar Ka Sikandar (1978) as J.D.
 Bhookh (1978) as Ranjeet 'Chhotey Thakur' H. Singh
 Salaam Memsaab (1979) as Gopal
 Raakhi Ki Saugandh (1979) as Ranjeet
 Muqabla (1979) as Banwari
 Do Ladke Dono Kadke (1979) as Ustad
 Sarkari Mehmaan (1979)
 Kartavya (1979) as Jacob
 Duniya Meri Jeb Mein (1979) as Rawat
 Lahu Ke Do Rang (1979) as Shankar Lathuria/Devi Dayal
 Yuvraaj (1979) as Mahendra 'Sidh Purush'
 Suhaag (1979) as Gopal
 Ahimsa (1979)
 Takkar (1980) as Ranjeet
 Swayamvar (1980) as Chander
 Aap Ke Deewane (1980) as Kundan
 Aakhri Insaaf (1980)
 The Burning Train (1980) as Chander
 Lootmaar (1980) as Peter
 Choron Ki Baaraat (1980) as Captain Ashok
 Unees-Bees (1980)
 Chambal Ki Kasam (1980)
 Neeyat (1980)
 Raksha (1981) as Daulatram
 Ladaaku (1981)
 Jwala Daku (1981) as Jwala's brother
 Paanch Qaidi (1981)
 Hum Se Badkar Kaun (1981) as Lalchand
 Yaarana (1981) as Jagdish 'Jaggu'
 Khoon Aur Paani (1981) as Vijay Singh
 Rocky (1981) as Jagdish aka 'J.D.'
 Laawaris (1981) as Mahendar Singh
 Hotel (1981) as Chhaganlal Patel
 Fiffty Fiffty (1981) as Kumar Virendra Singh
 Meri Aawaz Suno (1981) as Ronnie
 Yeh To Kamaal Ho Gaya (1982) as Chandru Singh
 Namak Halaal (1982) as Ranjit Singh
 Lakshmi (1982)
 Ghazab (1982) as Arjun Singh
 Rajput (1982) as Jaipal Singh
 Teesri Aankh as Ranjeet
 Sanam Teri Kasam (1982) as Robinson
 Waqt Ke Shehzade (1982) as Villain
Kalka (1983 film) as Chipa
 Taqdeer (1983) as Ranvir Pratap Singh
 Hum Se Hai Zamana (1983) as Ranjeet Ranvir Singh
 Hero (1983)
 Dard-E-Dil (1983)
 Ganga Meri Maa (1983)
 Ghungroo (1983) as Veera
 Achha Bura (1983) as Veer Singh/Vinay Sinha 'Veer'
 Waqt Ki Pukar (1984) as Ganpat Rai
 Sharara (1984)
 Sharaabi (1984) as Natwar
 Shapath (1984) as Ranjit
 Raaj Tilak (1984)
   Qaidi (1984) as Raghu
 Pakhandi (1984)
 Maqsad (1984) as Nagendra
 Kanoon Meri Mutthi Mein (1984)
 Dhokebaaz (1984)
 Aan Aur Shaan (1984)
 Inquilaab (1984) as Bhupathi/Excise Minister B. Pathi
 Naya Kadam (1984) as Gangu
   Jagir (1984) as Ranjeet Singh
 Hoshiyar (1985) as Shambudas
 Meetha Zehar (1985)
 Sarfarosh (1985) as Satyadev
 Ramkali (1985) as Pundait Hazari
 Ek Se Bhale Do (1985)
 Mehak (1985)
 Maha Shaktimaan (1985)
 Geraftaar (1985) as Ranjit Saxena
 Lallu Ram (1985)
 Maa Kasam (1985) as Balwant
 Krishna-Krishna (1986) as Pondrik Krishna Vasudev
 Ghar Sansar (1986) as David
 Ek Main Aur Ek Tu (1986)
 Aadamkhor (1986)
 Zindagani (1986) as Natwar Dadda
 Muqaddar Ka Faisla (1987) aa Chhadha
 Khazana (1987) (uncredited) as Randhir's friend - tribal leader
 Imaandaar (1987) as Ramesh Sinha
Madadgaar (1987)
 Dak Bangla (1987)
 Rahi (1987)
 Jaan Hatheli Pe (1987)
 Waqt Ki Awaz (1988)
 Gunahon Ka Faisla (1988) aa Dacoit
 Faisla (1988) as Rana
 Dharamyudh (1988) as Jaggu
 Sherni (1988) as Vinodpal Singh
 Marana Mrudangam (1988) as Saleem Shankar
 Do Waqt Ki Roti (1988) as Jagga B. Singh
 Mohabat Ka Paigham (1989) as Raja
 Meri Zabaan (1989) as Ranjeet Mehra
 Hum Bhi Insaan Hain (1989)
 Galiyon Ka Badshah (1989) as Tiger
 Aakhri Ghulam (1989)
 Gair Kaanooni (1989) as Robert DeCosta
 Prem Pratigyaa (1989) as Kallu Dada
 Daata (1989) as Natwar G. Sarang
 Paap Ka Anth (1989) as Shakaal
 Zakhmi Zameen (1990) as Bhairav
 Tejaa (1990) as Lal Singh
 Kishen Kanhaiya (1990) as Sridhar
 Karishma Kali Kaa (1990) as Dr. Ajay Ganotra
 Humse Na Takrana (1990)
 Zimmedaaar (1990) aa Ranjeet Singh
 Maut Ki Sazaa (1991) as Inspector Himmat Singh
 Jaan Ki Kasam (1991) as Jagdish
 Iraada (1991)
 Kurbaan (1991) (as Ranjit) as Singer
 Sainik (1993) (as Ranjit) as Ghajraj Chaudhary
 Bhagyawan (1993) as Hira
 Zaalim (1994) as Ranjit
 Aa Gale Lag Jaa (1994) as Dr. Mathur
 Dulaara (1994) as Police Inspector Vijay Chauhan
 Policewala Gunda as Kaalishankar Peeli Topiwaley
 Rani Hindustani (1995) as A.K. Chopra
 Oh Darling Yeh Hai India (1995) as Bidder
 Karan Arjun (1995) as Mr. Saxena
 Jai Vikraanta (1995) as Inspector Khote
 Hulchul (1995)
 Sautela Bhai (1996) as Rehman,Taxi Driver
 Aatank (1996) as Ranjeet
 Maahir (1996) as Bob
 Hum Hain Premi (1996)
 Shapath (1997) as Dr. Subramaniam Swami
 Daadagiri (1997) as Marshal
 Border (1997)
 Koyla (1997) as Dilawar
 Insaaf: The Final Justice (1997) as Inspector Lokhande
 Tarazu (1997) as Police Commissioner
 Aakrosh: Cyclone of Anger (1998) as Sairas
 Aaag Hi Aag (1999) (uncredited) as Gopal Bharti
 Bade Dilwala (1999) as Prosecuting Attorney
 Rajaji (1999) as Makhanlal
 Shaheed Uddham Singh: Alais Ram Mohammad Singh Azad (2000) as Gyaniji
 Bulandi (2000) as Ranjit Singh
 Badla Aurat Ka (2000)
 Kaali Topi Laal Rumaal (2000) as Mogha
 Dal: The Gang (2001) as Michael D'Souza
 Afsana Dilwalon Ka (2001) as Hassan
 Mein Hoon Pyassi Suhagan (2001) as Mumbai Police Commissioner
 Kasam (2001) as Hari Singh
 Aamdani Atthanni Kharcha Rupaiya (2001) (as Ranjith) as Boss
 Kehtaa Hai Dil Baar Baar (2002) as Immigration Officer
 Basti (2003)
 Kuch To Gadbad Hai (2004) as Chaudhry Sunil Singh
 Bunty Aur Babli (2005) as Store owner
 Saawan... The Love Season (2006) as Raj's dad
 Humko Deewana Kar Gaye (2006) as Harpreet Malhotra
 Dil Diya Hai (2006)
 Bombay to Goa (2007) as Colonel
 Welcome (2007) as Kapoor
 Yaar Meri Zindagi (2008) as Shamsher Singh
 Deshdrohi (2008)
 Krantiveer: The Revolution (2009) (in production)
 No Problem (2010)
 Paanch Ghantey Mien Paanch Crore (2012)
 Housefull 2: The Dirty Dozen  (2012)
 Shootout at Wadala (2013) as Bhatkar Dada
 Via 70 km (Punjabi) (2013)
 Mr Joe B. Carvalho(2014)
 Welcome Back (2015) 
 Aatankwadi (2017) (Bhojpuri Film)
Tiyaan (2017) (Malayalam Film)
 Housefull 4 (2019)

Director 
 Kaarnama (1990)
 Ghazab Tamasha (1992)

Producer 
 Ghazab Tamasha (1992)

Television
1994-1998 Junoon as Sherkhan Pathan
1997-Baat Ban Jaaye as Khanna
1999-2000 Gul Sanobar as Veer Singh the Commander of Hindustan
2006 - Aisa Des Hai Mera as Ranbir Singh Deol
2007 - Ghar Ek Sapnaa as Jagmohan
2008-2010 - Jugni Chali Jalandhar as Jagtaar Bhalla
2012 - Hitler Didi as Ranjeet Kukreja
2012 - R. K. Laxman Ki Duniya as Don
2015 - Kabhi Aise Geet Gaya Karo
2016 - Bhabi Ji Ghar Par Hai!
2016 - Trideviyaan as Gamosha

References

External links

Living people
20th-century Indian male actors
21st-century Indian male actors
Indian male film actors
Indian male television actors
Male actors in Hindi cinema
Male actors in Punjabi cinema
People from Amritsar district
Punjabi people
1942 births